The term ganglia may refer to:
 Plural form of ganglion, a cluster of neurons
 Lymph node
 Ganglion cyst
 Ganglia (software), a scalable distributed monitoring system for high-performance computing systems

See also 
 Ganglion (disambiguation)